Okhla is an urban neighborhood located near the Okhla barrage in the South East Delhi district of Delhi near the border between Delhi and Uttar Pradesh. Okhla has lent its name to the nearby planned township of New Okhla Industrial Development Authority or NOIDA. Okhla is also an assembly constituency.

About
Okhla is one of the oldest inhabited area in Delhi near the bank of Yamuna River. This can be judged from the making of Okhla canal (Agra Canal) by Britishers in 1874, presently known as Okhla Head.

History

The Okhla barrage, is a barrage, which was developed by British, is also the starting point of the Agra Canal built in 1874, today it is also the location of the Okhla Bird Sanctuary, and further down the canal towards Agra, the Keetham Lake, National Bird Sanctuary.

The present campus of Jamia Millia Islamia, a central university was established here in 1925. The Okhla Mandi is an important wholesale market in Delhi. Several services are nearby, including the NSIC, IIIT Delhi, Govind Ballabh Pant Engineering College, Meera Bai Institute of Technology, Kalkaji Temple, Lotus Temple, Okhla vihar, Okhla Railway Station, and the Okhla Water Works.

Okhla Industrial Estate
Okhla Industrial Estate, an industrial domain of New Delhi in South Delhi was established by National Small Industries Corporation and was one of the 12 such estates being developed across India to encourage small industries. Construction work at the site began in 1952 and it was finally inaugurated in 1958, and in time became synonymous to growth of small scale industries in region. Today it is divided in three phases.

Extension of Okhla
Apart from the Industrial Estate, Okhla also has an extension of several residential area which includes Zakir Nagar, Batla House, Jogabai and Jogabai Extension, Abul Fazal Enclave, Okhla Head, Jamia Nagar, Shaheen Bagh, Okhla Vihar, Johri Farm, Noor Nagar, Gaffar Manzil, Haji Colony, etc. and includes the colonies situated on the bank of the river Yamuna.

Phases 
Okhla Industrial Estate Phase I and Phase II is one of the 28 industrial areas of Delhi, as per the Master Plan of 2001. Revenue earners from this base include ready-made garment exporters and leather garment exporters, besides other segments of the industry such as pharmaceutical manufacturing units, plastic and packaging industries, printing presses, machinery manufacturers, call centers, MNCs Office, Bank, and others.

MNCs, Call centers, BPO, Showrooms, and Media Groups are actively operational in the area.

Overview
The whole industrial area was named after the main Okhla Village, in South Delhi. Nearby areas have now extensively grown ito neighbourhoods like Jogabai extension, Batla House, Okhla Vihar, Zakir Nagar, Jamia Nagar, Abul Fazal Enclave, Shaheen Bagh, Kalindi Colony, and Kalindi Kunj.

The Okhla neighbourhood has a high density of Muslim population, and show high linguistic literacy rate. It is a state assembly constituency, part of the East Delhi Lok Sabha constituency.

Neighbourhoods 
East of Kailash, New Friends Colony, Nehru Place, Kalkaji, Abul Fazal Enclave, Sukhdev Vihar, Greater Kailash, Govindpuri, Sriniwaspuri, Tuglaqabad, Sarita Vihar, Jasola, Shaheen Bagh, Jaitpur, Madanpur, Badarpur, Zakir Nagar, Okhla Vihar, Ghaffar Manzil Colony, Haji colony, Ishwar Nagar and Harkesh Nagar are the surrounding areas.

Wildlife sanctuaries 

Okhla Bird Sanctuary is a nearby Bird Park and Wildlife Sanctuary located in Noida, where during the month of September thousands of migratory birds including shovellers, pintail, common teal, gadwall, and blue-winged teal visit the area every year.

Hospitals 
There are many hospitals in the area, including Indraprastha Apollo Hospital, Al-Shifa, Cribbs, Fortis Escorts and other small hospitals and clinics.

Transport
Okhla is well connected via roadways and railways and is not too far away from the IGI Airport. Business districts such as Nehru Place and Connaught Place are considerably close resulting in good access to public services.

Okhla is also connected to the Delhi Metro Magenta Line Network - Jasola Vihar-Shaheen Bagh, Okhla Vihar, Jamia Millia Islamia & Sukhdev Vihar.

Delhi Transport Corporation buses via various Bus stops and terminus are operating from Okhla.

Further reading

See also

 Kaushalya Dam in Pinjore 
 Bhakra Dam
 Hathni Kund Barrage
 Tajewala Barrage
 Surajkund barrage
 List of National Parks & Wildlife Sanctuaries of Haryana, India

References

Neighbourhoods in Delhi
Villages in South Delhi district